Joy Lynn Hofmeister (born September 7, 1964) is an American educator and politician who served as the Oklahoma Superintendent of Public Instruction from 2015 to 2023. Hofmeister was sworn in as Oklahoma's 14th State Superintendent on January 12, 2015, after defeating the incumbent Republican candidate, Janet Barresi, in the primary election and Democratic candidate John Cox in the general election. Hofmeister was re-elected on November 6, 2018, and sworn in for a second four-year term as State Superintendent on January 14, 2019. Hofmeister won re-election after facing Democrat John Cox a second time, as well as independent candidate Larry Huff.

On October 7, 2021, Hofmeister changed her party affiliation to the Democratic Party and ran in the 2022 gubernatorial election, losing to incumbent Gov. Kevin Stitt. As a result of her switch, she became the only Democratic statewide elected official in Oklahoma and the first to hold office since 2011. At the end of her term in 2023, Democrats held no statewide offices in Oklahoma.

Education and career
Hofmeister is a former public school teacher and owner of a Kumon afterschool program business from Tulsa, Oklahoma. In the private sector, she spent 15 years operating Kumon Math & Reading Centers of South Tulsa.  This organization works through parent partnerships to ensure higher academic achievement for children.  During that time she personally worked with more than 4,000 students to improve their educational outcomes.

Hofmeister graduated with a bachelor's degree in education from Texas Christian University. As of May 2015, she is earning her master's degree in Education Administration with a specialty in Education Policy and Law from the University of Oklahoma.

In January 2012, Hofmeister was appointed to the Oklahoma State Board of Education by Governor Mary Fallin to fill the vacancy left by Phil Larkin Jr., who had vacated the seat after he was elected to Tulsa's city council. While serving on the State Board of Education, Hofmeister opposed Oklahoma State Superintendent of Public Instruction Janet Barresi's A-F grading scale for schools.  She resigned from the board on April 24, 2013.

State Superintendent

2014 campaign

The Tulsa World had been speculating that State Superintendent Janet Barresi would face a serious primary challenge since October 2012. On April 24, 2013, Hofmeister resigned from the Oklahoma State Board of Education in order to consider a run for State Superintendent. On January 7, 2014, Hofmeister announced her exploratory campaign's steering committee which included 20 Republican state legislators. In her formal campaign announcement, Hofmeister denounced what she called the Barresi "reign of terror," critiquing the incumbent for a "cookie cutter" and "one size fits all" approach to education reform.

During the campaign Barresi requested copies, under Oklahoma's open records laws, of all emails Hofmeister had exchanged with Jenks Public Schools since 2007. Hofmeister had been a parent of a JPS student and served on the board of the Jenks Public Schools Foundation. Two of Barresi's campaign staffers reviewed over 7,000 pages of emails. The campaign later requested all emails between Hofmeister and Tulsa Public Schools, Sand Springs Public Schools, Sapulpa Public Schools, and Union Public Schools. 

Barresi had a financial lead over Hofmeister throughout the campaign, ultimately spending almost $910,000 of her own money. Hofmeister, however, led in Republican primary polls, and won the June 2014 Republican primary, defeating Barresi. She defeated Democrat John Cox in the November general election. She was sworn in as Oklahoma's 14th Superintendent of Public Instruction on January 12, 2015.

First term

Assessment and accountability 
In 2016, Hofmeister led the charge to eliminate statewide end-of-instruction (EOI) exams for high school students, reducing the number of standardized tests to only those required under federal law (except US History), thereby significantly reducing testing costs.

College and career readiness 
In 2015, under Hofmeister's leadership, the Oklahoma State Department of Education created a statewide program for all high school juniors to take the ACT at no cost to families or schools. The program was expanded to allow a district to choose between ACT or SAT in 2016. In 2017, the program sparked a 29 percent increase in ACT participation.

2014 campaign finance
In 2014 Oklahoma County District Attorney David Prater announced his office was investigating complaints alleging that  Hofmeister's campaign for superintendent and a "dark money" PAC. The investigation stemmed from emails the District Attorney's office received from the campaign of Janet Barresi, Hofmeister's opponent. Hofmeister had allegedly met with Chad Alexander in April 2013 and Alexander later ran an anti-Barresi PAC. Hofmeister denounced the investigation as politically motivated.

Hofmeister was arrested in 2016 and charged with conspiracy and campaign finance violations in Oklahoma County. She denied wrongdoing and said: "I will vigorously defend my integrity and reputation against any suggestion of wrongdoing... And I will fight the allegations that have been made against me." Oklahoma Democrats, as well as a few Republicans, called for Hofmeister to resign.

On August 1, 2017, District Attorney David Prater dismissed all charges against Hofmeister. Charges against four other defendants were also dropped. Hofmeister said, "I knew I was innocent and that I had conducted myself appropriately, and I am happy that this day has come." Prater confirmed in 2018 that the charges "will not be revived... There is nothing there to look at."

2018 campaign

Second term
The conservative Thomas B. Fordham Institute rated the Oklahoma ESSA accountability plan, included in "Oklahoma Edge," among the highest in the nation.

Teacher compensation 
In 2018, the Oklahoma Legislature passed House Bill 1010xx, which raised more than half a billion dollars in revenue for the state. The landmark legislation, the first to earn the required three-fourths majority in both chambers since 1992, allowed for the first teacher pay raise in 10 years – an average salary increase of $6,100 for certified personnel. In addition, all full-time school support staff received a pay increase of $1,250. This measure was a significant victory for Hofmeister, who had advocated for competitive teacher pay since first taking office.

Trauma-informed instruction 
Hofmeister has worked to initiate a discussion surrounding mental health and resiliency for children, exploring the science of childhood trauma and its effects on learning. The Oklahoma State Department of Education organized statewide summits in 2018 and 2019, offering training for educators who are often the first to encounter trauma in individual children. Hofmeister is also pursuing the addition of a School Counselor Corps to increase the number of counselors in schools.

2022 gubernatorial campaign 

In 2021, Hofmeister changed her affiliation from Republican to the Democratic Party to run in the 2022 gubernatorial election. Hofmeister "describes herself as a moderate who can appeal to Oklahoma Republicans dissatisfied with the party’s Trumpist shift to the right" and takes a "centrist approach to many key policy issues, including abortion rights, taxation and teaching about race in schools." Hofmeister, running in reaction against Governor Kevin Stitt, stated that he had made McGirt v. Oklahoma a "political issue". Some Democrats were reported to "believe Hofmeister might be the right candidate to appeal to moderate Republicans willing to cross party lines." In 2022, before the overturning of Roe v. Wade, she had said that abortion is a "healthcare decision between a woman and her doctor, and it needs to stay that way." Hofmeister had clashed with Stitt in the past over school vouchers and education spending.

Personal life
Hofmeister is a mother of four, all of whom attended Jenks Public Schools in Jenks, Oklahoma. Hofmeister served as an officer for the Jenks Public Schools Foundation Board of Directors.

Hofmeister currently lives in Tulsa, Oklahoma, with her husband Gerald Hofmeister. Hofmeister is a Southern Baptist.

Electoral history

2014

2018

2022

References

External links

 State Superintendent of Public Instruction official government website
 Joy for Oklahoma campaign website
 

|-

1964 births
21st-century American politicians
21st-century American women politicians
American politicians who switched parties
Candidates in the 2022 United States elections
Living people
Oklahoma Democrats
Oklahoma Republicans
Oklahoma Superintendents of Public Instruction
Texas Christian University alumni
University of Oklahoma alumni
Women in Oklahoma politics